This list of newspapers in Spain includes daily, weekly Spanish newspapers issued in Spain. In 1950 the number of daily newspapers in circulation in Spain was 104; by 1965 this figure had fallen to 87. In 1984, in the period following the transition to democracy, the number of daily newspapers had risen to 115. Since then, however, the advent of new media has been accompanied by a decline both in newspaper circulation figures overall and in the number of titles published, the years 2008 to 2012 seeing the closure of 31 titles.

List
Below is a list of general-interest daily newspapers published in Spain with circulations of over 5,000, according to data from the Spanish Oficina de Justificación de la Difusión for the period January to December 2013.

Other papers include:

 El Faro (Ceuta and Melilla)
 El Pueblo de Ceuta
 Ceuta al Día
 Melilla Hoy

Special-interest papers
Below is a list of business- and sports-related daily newspapers in Spain with circulations of over 5,000, according to data from the Spanish Audit Bureau of Circulation. Below this list is a list of foreign-language newspapers in Spain.

Foreign-language papers 
Foreign-language papers (circulation figures are estimates):
Costa News - Costa Blanca News / Costa Levante News / Costa Almeria News / Costa del Sol News  - website
Costa Nachrichten - Costa Blanca Nachrichten / Costa Cálida Nachrichten / Costa del Sol News  - website
Novosti Costa - Novosti Costa Blanca   - website
The Olive Press - Andalucia / Mallorca / Gibraltar / Costa Blanca - 120,000 -  website
Euro Weekly News - Costa del Sol / Costa Blanca North /Costa Blanca South/ Costa de Almeria / Mallorca / Axarquia - 600,000 - Spanish News
Le Courrier d'Espagne - website
La Nuestra Tierra
RTN Newspaper - Costa Blanca North / Costa Blanca South / Costa del Sol - 90,000 - website
SolTimes - Almeria / Costa Blanca / Costa Calida / Roquetas de Mar - 90,000 - website
SpanishNews - Barcelona - 5,000 - website
The Times of Earth - Madrid, Barcelona, Paris - 9,000 - website
BCN Mes - Barcelona- 15,000 - website
 The Resident - Andalucia -  10,000 - website
 Po Russki  - Costa del Sol / Costa Blanca / Costa Almeria / Mallorca / -  25,000 - website
 The Ibizan - Ibiza & Formentera -  30,000 - website
The Weekend World Newspaper - Andalucía - 25,000 - website
The CoastRider - Costa Blanca / Costa Calida - 20,000
Newsbriefs News app - Spain news in English - 30,000

See also
 Media of Spain
 List of magazines in Spain
 Internet in Spain
 Television in Spain
 Radio in Spain

References

Bibliography

External links
 Prensa Escrita – List of Spanish-language newspapers (in Spanish)
 Spanish digital newspapers – All Spanish newspapers in Spanish language
 Spanish Newspapers and News Sites – List of Spanish newspapers and online news sites in English

Spain
Newspapers